Saint-Mars-du-Désert may refer to the following places in France:

 Saint-Mars-du-Désert, Loire-Atlantique, a commune in the Loire-Atlantique department
 Saint-Mars-du-Désert, Mayenne, a commune in the Mayenne department